Biographia Juridica: A Biographical Dictionary Of The Judges Of England From The Conquest To The Present Time, 1066-1870 is a lengthy and rigorous review of the major legal minds in British history. It was compiled by Edward Foss, a lawyer and devoted amateur historian who died only two months before its publication in 1870.

References
Biographia Juridica: A Biographical Dictionary of the Judges of England from the Conquest to the Present Time, 1066–1870. John Murray. London. 1870. Digitized copies from Google Books  .
Marke, Julius Jay. A Catalogue of the Law Collection at New York University. New York University. 1953. Reprinted by the Lawbook Exchange Ltd. 1999. Page 151. Digitized copy from Google Books.

British biographical dictionaries
History books about England
Books about legal history
1870 books